The 2020 Conference USA football season was the 25th season of college football play for Conference USA (C-USA). It was played from September 3, 2020 until December 18, 2020. The league consisted of 14 members in two divisions. It was part of the 2020 NCAA Division I FBS football season.

Preseason

Preseason Awards
The conference preseason awards were released On August 25.

Preseason Offensive Player of the Year: Brenden Knox, Junior, RB, Marshall
Preseason Defensive Player of the Year: DeAngelo Malone, Senior, DE, WKU
Preseason Special Teams Player of the Year: John Haggerty, Sophomore, Punter, WKU

Media predictions
No 2020 Preseason Media Poll was released by Conference USA.

Head coaches
Note: All stats shown are before the start of the 2020 season.

Rankings

Schedule

Old Dominion suspended all Fall sports including football for the 2020 season. Rice suspended the start of the football season till September 26 on August 8. Rice pushed the start of their football season back an additional month, not starting play until October 24.

Regular season

Week One

Week Two

Week Three

Week Four

Week Five

Week Six

Week Seven

Week Eight

Week Nine

Week Ten

Week Eleven

Week Twelve

Week Thirteen

Week Fourteen

Week Fifteen

Conference USA Championship Game

Postseason

Bowl games

Rankings are from CFP rankings. All times Eastern Time Zone. C-USA teams shown in bold.

Note: UAB was originally slated to play in the Gasparilla Bowl on December 26. However, the bowl was cancelled after their opponent, South Carolina, was forced to withdraw due to COVID-19 issues among the team.

Selection of teams
Bowl eligible: 
Bowl-ineligible:

Awards and honors

Player of the week honors

C–USA Individual Awards
The following individuals received postseason honors as voted by the Conference USA football coaches at the end of the season

All-conference teams

 

*Denotes Unanimous Selection

Ref:

All Conference Honorable Mentions:

Offense:

Defense:

Special Teams:

All-Americans

The 2020 College Football All-America Teams are composed of the following College Football All-American first teams chosen by the following selector organizations: Associated Press (AP), Football Writers Association of America (FWAA), American Football Coaches Association (AFCA), Walter Camp Foundation (WCFF), The Sporting News (TSN), Sports Illustrated (SI), USA Today (USAT) ESPN, CBS Sports (CBS), FOX Sports (FOX) College Football News (CFN), Bleacher Report (BR), Scout.com, Phil Steele (PS), SB Nation (SB), Athlon Sports, Pro Football Focus (PFF) and Yahoo! Sports (Yahoo!).

Currently, the NCAA compiles consensus all-America teams in the sports of Division I-FBS football and Division I men's basketball using a point system computed from All-America teams named by coaches associations or media sources.  The system consists of three points for a first-team honor, two points for second-team honor, and one point for third-team honor.  Honorable mention and fourth team or lower recognitions are not accorded any points.  Football consensus teams are compiled by position and the player accumulating the most points at each position is named first team consensus all-American.  Currently, the NCAA recognizes All-Americans selected by the AP, AFCA, FWAA, TSN, and the WCFF to determine Consensus and Unanimous All-Americans. Any player named to the First Team by all five of the NCAA-recognized selectors is deemed a Unanimous All-American.

All-Academic

National award winners

C-USA records vs Other Conferences
2020–2021 records against non-conference foes:

Regular Season

Post Season

C-USA vs Power Five matchups
This is a list of games the Sun Belt has scheduled versus power conference teams (ACC, Big 10, Big 12, Pac-12, BYU/Notre Dame and SEC). All rankings are from the current AP Poll at the time of the game.

C-USA vs Group of Five matchups
The following games include C-USA teams competing against teams from the American, MAC, Mountain West or Sun Belt.

C-USA vs FBS independents matchups
The following games include C-USA teams competing against FBS Independents, which includes Army, Liberty, New Mexico State, or UMass.

C–USA vs FCS matchups

NFL Draft

The following list includes all C-USA players who were drafted in the 2021 NFL Draft.

References